The Criminal is a 1999 British thriller film directed by Julian Simpson and starring Steven Mackintosh, Eddie Izzard and Natasha Little. After meeting a beautiful woman in a bar, a man's life is plunged into chaos.

Cast
 Steven Mackintosh - Jasper Rawlins 
 Eddie Izzard - Peter Hume 
 Natasha Little - Sarah Maitland 
 Yvan Attal - Mason 
 Holly Aird - Detective Sergeant Rebecca White 
 Bernard Hill ...  Detective Inspector Walker 
 Andrew Tiernan - Harris 
 Jana Carpenter - Grace 
 Justin Shevlin - The Barker 
 Barry Stearn - Noble
 Norman Lovett - Clive 
 Timothy Bateson - Thomas 
 Abigail Blackmore -Barmaid 
 Matthew Blackmore - Guy 
 Ingrid Bradley - Scantily dressed woman 
 Daniel Brocklebank - Jonny 
 Danny Edwards - Made-up Woman 
 Amanda Foster - City type 
 Eamon Geoghegan - Forensic 
 Nick Holder - American tourist 
 Dave Holland - City type 
 Lisa Jacobs - Lucy 
 Georgia Mackenzie - Maggie

References

External links

1999 films
British thriller films
1999 thriller films
1990s English-language films
1990s British films